Karl Fredrik "Charles" Ericksen (1875 – February 23, 1916) was a Norwegian-American wrestler who competed in the 1904 Summer Olympics for the United States.

In 1904, he won a gold medal in the welterweight category.

In 2012, Norwegian historians found documentation showing that Ericksen did not receive American citizenship until 22 March 1905. The historians thus petitioned to have Ericksen's gold registered as Norwegian, against Ericksen's wishes.

References

External links

Proof of Norwegian citizenship at the time of the games (in Norwegian)

1875 births
1916 deaths
Olympic wrestlers of the United States
Wrestlers at the 1904 Summer Olympics
American male sport wrestlers
Olympic gold medalists for the United States in wrestling
Medalists at the 1904 Summer Olympics
Norwegian emigrants to the United States